Testimony is the debut studio album by American R&B singer August Alsina. It was released on April 15, 2014, by Def Jam Recordings. The album was supported by six singles: "I Luv This Shit", "Ghetto", "Numb", "Make It Home", "Kissin' on My Tattoos" and "No Love"; along with the release of his promotional single, "Benediction".

Upon its release, Testimony was met with positive reviews from music critics, who praised Alsina's introduction to the scenario of mainstream R&B music. The album debuted at number 2 on the Billboard 200, with first-week sales of 67,000 copies in the United States. The album features guest appearances from Nicki Minaj, Chris Brown, Yo Gotti, B.o.B, Rich Homie Quan, Trey Songz and Def Jam label-mates Pusha T, Rick Ross, Fabolous, Jeezy and Trinidad James.

Singles
On February 14, 2013, the music video was released for the lead single, "I Luv This Shit" featuring Trinidad James. The song was produced by Knucklehead. It was officially released for digital download on February 19, 2013. The song peaked at number 48 on the US Billboard Hot 100, and number 13 on the Billboard Hot R&B/Hip-Hop Songs charts.

On December 9, 2013, the album's second single, "Ghetto" featuring Rich Homie Quan, was serviced to urban contemporary radio in the United States. Knucklehead also produced this track. It was officially released for digital download on February 11, 2014.

On December 2, 2013, the music video was released for "Numb" featuring B.o.B. and Yo Gotti. On December 10, 2013, "Numb" was released as the album's third single. The song was produced by DJ Mustard.

On January 15, 2014, the album's fourth single, "Make It Home" featuring Jeezy, was released for digital download. It was sent to US urban contemporary radio on March 3, 2014. On February 13, 2014, the music video was released for "Make It Home" featuring Jeezy.

On April 1, 2014, the album's fifth single, "Kissin' on My Tattoos" was released. The song was produced by Jasper Cameron.

The album's sixth single was the remix to "No Love" featuring Nicki Minaj, which was serviced to urban adult contemporary radio in the United States on July 29, 2014.

Other songs
On April 15, 2014, the music video was released for "Get Ya Money" featuring Fabolous. On June 26, 2014, the music video was released for "FML" featuring Pusha T. On July 1, 2014, the music video was released for "Benediction" featuring Rick Ross; the video also features a cameo appearances from DJ Khaled.

Promotion
To promote the album, Alsina began the Testimony Live tour in the United States on August 14, 2014.

Critical response

Upon its release, Testimony was met with positive reviews from music critics. At Metacritic, which assigns a normalized rating out of 100 to reviews from critics, the album received an average score of 79 based on 5 reviews. Andy Kellman of AllMusic said, "This is a gratifying second step from one of the most exciting contemporary R&B artists to appear during the 2010s."

Erin Lowers of XXL gave the album an L rating, saying "Finding the balance between sex, love, and ratchet, Testimony is truly a testament to a new era in R&B that shifts safe lyrics to smooth street tales." Brandon Soderberg of Spin said, "Usually, in-the-pocket R&B does fine with middling MCs, but Testimony, powered by Alsina's insider-outsider personality – sensitive romantic with a crime-haunted past – doesn't need these big dumb lugs for cred, or even menace. Testimony brings rap's raw nerve detail to the sturdy slow jam, nullifying the need for nods to R&B of the "rap and bullshit" variety."

Commercial performance
Testimony debuted at number two on the US Billboard 200 chart, selling 67,000 copies in its first week. This became Alsina's first US top-ten debut on the chart. In its second week, the album dropped to number five on the chart, selling an additional 20,000 copies. In its third week, the album dropped to number 18 on the chart, selling 12,000 more copies. In its fourth week, the album dropped to number 35 on the chart, selling 9,000 copies. As of November 2015, the album has sold 287,000 copies in the United States. On September 1, 2021, the album was certified platinum by the Recording Industry Association of America (RIAA) for combined sales and album-equivalent units of over one million units in the United States.

Track listing

Notes
 signifies a vocal producer.

Sample credits
"You Deserve" contains a sample from "Love Ballad" performed by L.T.D.

Charts

Weekly charts

Year-end charts

Certifications

Release history

See also
List of Billboard number-one R&B albums of 2014

References

2014 debut albums
August Alsina albums
Def Jam Recordings albums
Albums produced by DJ Mustard
Albums produced by Drumma Boy
Albums produced by Eric Hudson
Albums produced by Jasper Cameron